Siraitia grosvenorii, also known as monkfruit or luohan guo, is a herbaceous perennial vine of the gourd family, Cucurbitaceae. It is native to southern China. The plant is cultivated for its fruit extract, called mogrosides, which creates a sweetness sensation 250 times stronger than sucrose. Mogroside extract has been used as a low-calorie sweetener for drinks and in traditional Chinese medicine.

The scientific species name honors Gilbert Hovey Grosvenor, who, as president of the National Geographic Society, helped to fund an expedition in the 1930s to find the living plant in China where it was already being cultivated.

Etymology and regional names
Monkfruit was first mentioned in the records of 13th-century Chinese monks in Guangxi in the region of Guilin. The difficulty of cultivation meant the fruit did not become part of the Chinese herbal tradition which depended on more readily available products.

Luóhàn (羅漢) is a shortened form of āluóhàn, which is an old transliteration of the Indian Sanskrit word arhat (prakrit: arahant). In early Buddhist traditions, a monk who becomes enlightened is called an arhat who attains the "fruition of arhatship" (Sanskrit: arhattaphala). This was rendered in Chinese as luóhàn guǒ (羅漢果 literally "arhat fruit") which later became the Chinese and western commercial designation for this type of sweet fruit.

It may also be called la han qua (from Vietnamese  la hán quả, which also means Arhat  fruit), or longevity fruit (also used for other fruits).

History and distribution
The first report in England on the herb was found in an unpublished manuscript written in 1938 by G. Weidman Groff and Hoh Hin Cheung. The report stated the fruits were often used as the main ingredients of "cooling drinks" as remedies for hot weather, fever, or other dysfunctions traditionally associated with warmth or heat (e.g., inflammation).

The fruit was taken to the United States in the early 20th century. Groff mentioned that, during a visit to the American ministry of agriculture in 1917, the botanist Frederick Coville showed him a luo han guo fruit bought in a Chinese shop in Washington, DC.  Seeds of the fruit, which had been bought in a Chinese shop in San Francisco, were entered into the botanic description of the species in 1941.

The first research into the sweet component of luo han guo is attributed to C. H. Lee, who wrote an English report on it in 1975, and also to Tsunematsu Takemoto, who worked on it the early 1980s in Japan (later Takemoto decided to concentrate on the similar sweet plant, jiaogulan).

The development of luo han guo products in China has continued ever since, focusing in particular on the development of concentrated extracts.

Description
The vine attains a length of 3 to 5 m, climbing over other plants by means of tendrils which twine around anything they touch.  The narrow, heart-shaped leaves are 10–20 cm long. The fruit is round, 5–7 cm in diameter, smooth, yellow-brownish or green-brownish in color, containing striations from the fruit stem end of the furrows with a hard but thin skin covered by fine hairs.  The inside of the fruit contains an edible pulp, which, when dried, forms a thin, light brown, brittle shell about 1 mm in thickness. The seeds are elongated and almost spherical.

The interior fruit is eaten fresh, and the rind is used to make tea.

The monk fruit is notable for its sweetness, which can be concentrated from its juice. The fruit contains 25 to 38% of various carbohydrates, mainly fructose and glucose. The sweetness of the fruit is increased by the mogrosides, a group of triterpene glycosides (saponins). The five different mogrosides are numbered from I to V; the main component is mogroside V, which is also known as esgoside.

Mogroside biosynthesis
One analysis of 200 candidate genes of Siraitia grosvenorii revealed five enzyme families involved in the synthesis of mogroside V: squalene epoxidases, triterpenoid synthases, epoxide hydrolases, cytochrome P450s, and UDP-glucosyltransferases. The metabolic pathway for mogroside biosynthesis involves an initial stage of fruit development when squalene is metabolized to di-glucosylated, tetra-hydroxycucurbitadienols, then during fruit maturation, branched glucosyl groups are added and catalyzed, leading to the sweet M4, M5, and M6 mogrosides.

Cultivation
Germination of seeds is slow and may take several months. It is grown primarily in the far southern Chinese province of Guangxi (mostly in the mountains near Guilin), as well as in Guangdong, Guizhou, Hunan, and Jiangxi. These mountains lend the plants shade and often are surrounded by mists which protect the plants from the sun. Nonetheless, the climate in this southern province is warm. The plant is rarely found in the wild, so it has been cultivated for hundreds of years.

Records as early as 1813 mention the cultivation of this plant in the Guangxi province. Most of the plantations are located in Yongfu County and Lingui County.

Longjiang Town in Yongfu County has acquired the name "home of the Chinese luohanguo fruit"; a number of companies specialised in making luohanguo extracts and finished products have been set up in the area. The Yongfu Pharmaceutical Factory is the oldest of these.

Traditional processing

Luohan guo is harvested in the form of a round, green fruit, which becomes brown on drying. It is rarely used in its fresh form, as it is hard to store when fresh.

Thus, the fruits are usually dried before further use and are sold in this fashion in Chinese herbal shops. The fruits are dried slowly in ovens, preserving them and removing most of the unwanted aromas. However, this technique also leads to the formation of several bitter and astringent flavors. This limits the use of the dried fruits and extracts to the preparation of diluted tea, soup, and as a sweetener for products that would usually have sugar or honey added to them.

Commercial manufacturing
The process for the manufacture of a useful sweetener from luo han guo was patented in 1995 by Procter & Gamble. The patent states that luo han guo has many interfering flavors, which render it useless for general applications, and describes a process to remove them. The offending compounds are sulfur-containing volatile substances such as hydrogen disulfide, methional, methionol, dimethylsulfide, and methylmercaptan, which are formed from amino acids that contain sulfur, such as methionine, S-methylmethionine, cystine, and cysteine.

Sweetening agent
The sweet taste of the fruit comes mainly from mogrosides, a group of triterpene glycosides that make up about 1% of the flesh of the fresh fruit. Through solvent extraction, a powder containing 80% mogrosides can be obtained, the main one being mogroside-5 (esgoside). Other similar agents in the fruit are siamenoside and neomogroside.

In this process, the peel and seeds are removed, and the pulped fruit is made into a fruit concentrate or puree. Additional juice may be extracted from the remaining pulp by hot water. The juice is homogenized, acidified slightly to prevent gelling and improve the flavor, then treated with pectinase or other enzymes to break down the pectin.  Most of the off-flavor agents are then removed with ion-exchange resins, such as sulfonated polystyrene-divinylbenzene copolymer or polyacrylic acid. Alternatively, the off-flavors can be adsorbed by agents like charcoal or bentonite, which are removed by filtration; or precipitated with gelatin or other gelling agents.  Most of the remaining sulfurous volatiles are then removed by low-pressure evaporation. The juice is then pasteurized to inactivate remaining natural enzymes and kill micro-organisms. The process is claimed to preserve a substantial fraction of the mogrosides present in the fruit, with the resulting sweetness at a level about 250 times stronger than sucrose.

Safety
At least one generally recognized as safe (GRAS) notice has been received by the U.S. Food and Drug Administration.

In Europe, it is classified as an unapproved Novel Food (not used in the food system before May 1997) which means that it may be marketed as a food or food ingredient only after a safety assessment and approval by the European Commission; as of 2023, Siraitia grosvenorii was not listed among approved Novel Foods in the EU.

Traditional uses
The plant is most prized for its sweet fruits as a sweetener. In traditional Chinese medicine, it is used for cough and sore throat. The fruits are generally sold in dried form, and used in herbal tea or soup.

References

External links

Cucurbitoideae
Fruits originating in Asia
Flora of China
Crops originating from China
Plants used in traditional Chinese medicine
Dietary supplements
Sugar substitutes
Tropical fruit